St Helen's Church was a church located near Santon, Norfolk, England. Its site is a scheduled monument. It was no longer in existence by 1368.

The church is noted in the Domesday Book: "Among the lands of Stigand the archbishop which William de Noiers keeps for the use of the king, in Thetford ... one church of St. Helen, with one ploughland ..."

References

Former churches in Norfolk